98.8 Castle FM (formerly Leith FM) is a radio station, covering the area of Scotland. The station started broadcasting on 7 May 2007 and was made available on 98.8FM throughout Edinburgh and its surrounding area as well as online.

On 23 March 2012, the station changed its name to 98.8 Castle FM with the strapline 'Edinburgh's bigger local mix' serving the community of the Capital. The licence-holding company (Leith Community Mediaworks Ltd) filed accounts in 2012 as a dormant company with no assets.

As of mid-December 2015 Castle FM changed its name to "Scotland's Castle", the station is available in all major streaming platforms 24hrs a day playing a mixture of current and oldies with the stations strapline "radio for Scotland"

Selected former presenters 
Robert Baldock & Andy Fielding (Project Moonbase, 2007–2010)
Paula Cameron
Nikai Chalaman Cruz
Al Chivers (The Al Chivers Alternative Show)
Ally D
Steven Hogg
Donnie Hughes
John Hunt
Ewan Irvine
Penny Jackson
Dave Knight
John Leslie
Lenny Love
Ray McMahon
Tony McQue
Matt Shields
Jason Smith
Joanna Sproule
Kathryn Sproule
Richard & Carly Templeman
Lewis Wilson

References

Leith
Radio stations in Edinburgh